Eros Now is an Indian subscription-based over-the-top, video on-demand entertainment and media platform, launched in 2012. It is owned and controlled by Eros Digital, the Indian digital media management arm of the Indian-American multinational media company Eros Media World. The network offers media streaming and video-on-demand services.

History and growth

Founded in the year 1977, Eros International plc started its business with movie acquisitions and within a few years it went on to become India's first distributors of VHS. In the year 2012, when Eros launched Eros Now, its digital on-demand entertainment platform, the company got transformed into a fully vertically integrated studio. Eros Now targets the 1.5 billion population of Indian Entertainment world over. In the initial launch phase, Eros Now started with films and music videos as its primary content. From 2012 to 2018, it has added content such as short films, web-series and specially curated content under the originals bouquet. Eros Now has also tied- up with various leading telecom and content players to stay ahead of the curve.

Content library

Eros Now has more than 12,000 digital titles that include movies, television shows, music videos and 2.5 lakhs music tracks. The platform has blockbuster films like Cheeni Kum, Happy Bhag Jayegi, Manmarziyaan, Bajirao Mastani, Tanu Weds Manu Returns, Goliyon ki raasleela Ram-Leela, Rockstar, Shubh Mangal Savdhan, Vicky Donor, Mukkabaaz, Munna Michael, Ki & Ka, English Vinglish, Sellvandhan, Zindagi Virat Hain, Maine Pyaar Kiya and Padosan amongst many other titles across 10 Indian regional languages. The digital on-demand platform has a collection of international shows which are aired on Hum TV and ARY TV.

Original Programs

In January 2018, Eros Now premiered their first short- film ‘Toffee’ starring Syna Anand and Sammaera Jaiswal. In February 2018, Eros Now made an announcement of rolling out its original content in the second half of the year, which would include films, series, features and short-format films. In April 2018, Eros Now released India's first direct-to-digital film Meri Nimmo. And in September 2018, Eros Now launched its first original show ‘Side Hero’   directed by Rohan Sippy and starring Kunaal Roy Kapoor, Gauahar Khan, Gopal Dutt and Arjun Kanungo. Followed by the launch of flag ship original web show ‘Smoke’  in October 2018 starring Tom Alter, Jim Sarbh, Mandira Bedi and Kalki Koechlin. Smoke was the only Indian web series to be showcased at the coveted annual event MIPCOM 2018 at Cannes in France under Made in India Originals category.

Eros Now also has web-series and films like A Monsoon Date, Maunn, Salute Siachen, Black & White interviews and more in their segment called E- Buzz.

In December 2018, Eros Now further expanded its content strategy with the launch of Eros Now Quickie, a short video format segment. The first two Eros Now Quickies were Date Gone Wrong, Paise Fek Tamasha Dekh, started streaming on 19 December 2018. On 6 January 2019, Eros Now launched its third quickie, The Investigation which featured digital debut of television actor Hiten Tejwani playing the role of a Mumbai Crime Branch officer investigating a murder while Leena Jumani (Kumkum Bhagya and Punar Vivah) played his onscreen wife. On 12 January, the fourth Eros Now Quickie, Tum Se Na Ho Paayega was launched and featured Aakashdeep Arora and Juhi Bhatt in the lead role. The show was a light-hearted content which revolved around a small town boy, Bala, and his inability to deal with inter-gender behaviour of the progressive world.

Eros Now launched its next original, Operation Cobra on 15 February. It marked the digital debut or television actor Gautam Gulati playing the role of a R.A.W. agent Karan Singh while Ruhi Singh and Nyra Banerjee essayed the role of MI6 agent Riya Sharma and terrorist Tahira Shaikh respectively. On 3 March 2019, Eros Now launched its next original, Metro Park. The show is directed by Abi Varghese, and stars Ranvir Shorey, Purbi Joshi, Vega Tamotia, Omi Vaidya and Pitobash.

Subscription and subscriber base

Eros Now's business model is subscription based with three types of streaming membership plans. The basic plan (in India) includes access to standard definition quality streaming without functionality at INR 49. The plus plan (in India) allows unlimited access and functionality to streaming including access to HD streaming and features such as offline download, watch lists and playlists at INR 99. The premium plan (international) includes access to high definition and a full feature set. The pricing varies across countries i.e. USA US$7.99 per month, UK £4.99 GBP, UAE DHMS 20, Malaysia MYR10.

Eros Now has 128 million registered users and 30 million paying subscribers worldwide. (Total paid subscribers may include those who are on a paid, free-trial or via minimum guarantee as long as a method of payment has been provided.) 

Eros Now has 18 million subscribers on YouTube and it is one of the Top 100 most subscribed YouTube channels in India.

Partnerships

Telecom partnerships

Platform alliances

Online Payment Partnership

Advertising Partnership

Content partnerships

Other partnerships

Sponsorship

Eros Now was the title sponsor of Royal Challengers Bangalore in Indian Premiere League 2018.

Key people

 Rishika Lulla, the CEO of Eros Digital, covers all of the digital initiatives for Eros including Eros Now.
 Ali-Hussein-appointed-as-COO—Eros-Digital
 Ridhima Lulla, the Chief Content Officer of Eros Now strengthens the original content strategy for Eros Now.
 Lokesh Chauhan is the Chief Technology Officer of Eros

Awards and recognitions

In 2016, The Economic Times named Eros Now as one of the 7 hottest rivals of Netflix in India.
In the same year, Apple named Eros Now in the list of best apps on App Store
Eros Now named as ‘Best OTT Platform of the Year 2019’ at the British Asian Media Awards

References

External links
 

Subscription video on demand services